Wang Yang is a district (amphoe) of Nakhon Phanom province, northeastern Thailand.

Geography
Neighboring districts are (from the north clockwise): Pla Pak and Na Kae of Nakhon Phanom Province; Khok Si Suphan and Phon Na Kaeo of Sakon Nakhon province.

History
The minor district (king amphoe) Wang Yang was established on 1 July 1997, when four tambons were split off from Na Kae district.

On 15 May 2007, all 81 minor districts were upgraded to full districts. With publication in the Royal Gazette on 24 August the upgrade became official.

Administration

Central administration 
Wang Yang is divided into four sub-districts (tambons), which are further subdivided into 27 administrative villages (mubans).

Local administration 
There are three sub-district administrative organizations (SAO) in the district:
 Wang Yang consisting of sub-districts Wang Yang and Nong Pho.
 Khok Si consisting of sub-district Khok Si.
 Yot Chat consisting of sub-district Yot Chat.

References

External links
amphoe.com

Wang Yang